Twm Siôn Cati (also sometimes spelt Twm Sion Cati, historically Twm Shon Catti or Twm Shon Catty) is a figure in Welsh folklore.

Background 

Tales about him vary on details, but he is usually said to have been born in or very near to Tregaron, in or around 1530, his mother being one Cati Jones of Tregaron. His father was supposed to be Siôn ap Dafydd ap Madog ap Hywel Moetheu of Porth-y-ffin, also near Tregaron. He was an illegitimate son whose mother named him Thomas. The Welsh-language equivalent of Tom is Twm. It was also common practice in rural Wales for children with common names to be nicknamed after their mothers. Thus he became known as Twm Siôn Cati.

He was supposedly a Protestant by faith at a time when Mary I of England, a Catholic monarch, ruled and he had to gain an income as best he could, choosing robbery as his trade as his religion had him marked out as a rebel already and his high status meant that he could rely on any advantage or protection from others. As a young man he fled to Geneva in 1557 to escape the law. After the accession of the Protestant Queen Elizabeth I, he was able to obtain a pardon for his thievery, enabling his return to Wales in 1559.

Twm was active in west Wales, with forays into England, in the late sixteenth century.  Stories centre on his tricks, with which he outwitted law-abiding people and criminals alike.

The original character is often said to have been based on one Thomas Jones (c. 1530–1609) who, according to the Oxford Companion to the Literature of Wales, was pardoned for unspecified offences in 1559, wrote poetry, was a steward who "often had recourse to the law", and married the widow of Thomas Rhys Williams of Ystrad-ffin. It seems unlikely, however, that all the tales told of Twm Siôn Cati in later times can be attributed to this one man. The Oxford Companion further asserts "he has been confused with others of the same name who were raiders and highwaymen in the district of Tregaron" and lists another eleven Thomas Joneses in the field of literature alone. The Dictionary of Welsh Biography identifies Jones as a cousin of John Dee, and his second wife as a daughter of John Prise.

Although the original tales were passed on orally, there were later a number of written stories of Twm Siôn Cati.  An English-language pamphlet, Tomshone Catty's Tricks, was printed in 1763.  William Frederick Deacon wrote two books involving him in the 1820s. In 1828, T J Llewelyn Prichard's The Adventures and Vagaries of Twm Shon Catti, descriptive of Life in Wales was published.  Enlarged (and somewhat altered) editions of this followed. An eight-page pamphlet, Y Digrifwr, was published in 1811, its subtitle admirably describing its contents ("The jokester: a collection of feats and tricks of Thomas Jones of Tregaron, Cardiganshire, he who is generally known under the name Twm Sion Catti").  George Borrow, walking through Wild Wales in 1854, heard several tales about Twm from a fellow-walker on the way to Tregaron and later read what was probably Prichard's book.

In the tale told by Llewelyn Prichard, Twm is the illegitimate son of Cati Jones following attentions from John Wynn of Gwydir (John "Wynn" ap Maredudd); the Welsh forms of the names of his parents became incorporated into his name. He grows up in Tregaron and after a spell working for a farmer, he works for a local landowner. He is trusted to take a large sum of the squire's money to England. The journey is fraught with encounters with highwaymen, footpads, and villains, all of whom Twm is able to best. Twm woos and eventually marries the Lady of Ystrad-ffin and subsequently becomes a magistrate and mayor of Brecon.

George Borrow disapproved of the veneer of respectability in Prichard's book: "Its grand fault is endeavouring to invest Twm Shon (a name Borrow spells with varying consistency) with a character of honesty, and to make his exploits appear rather those of a wild young waggish fellow than of a robber." According to the stories which Borrow picked up around Tregaron, Twm's career was more straightforward.  "Between eighteen and nineteen, in order to free himself and his mother from poverty which they had long endured, he adopted the profession of a thief, and soon became celebrated through the whole of Wales for the cleverness and adroitness which he exercised in his calling".

It is rumoured that Twm had a number of illegitimate children during his time as a highway man. To hide the true identity of their father, the children were given religious or biblical surnames.

Tall tales

Borrow recounted a story in which a farmer is hunting Twm over the theft of a bullock. The farmer reaches Twm's mother's house and asks whether Twm Shone Catti (another of Borrow's spellings) lives there. A beggar answers that he does, and agrees to hold the farmer's horse and whip for him. As the farmer goes into the house, the beggar jumps onto the horse: it is Twm. He gallops to the house of the farmer and tells the farmer's wife that the farmer is in trouble, needs money urgently, and has sent Twm to fetch it, with the horse and whip to prove that the message really came from the farmer. The farmer's wife pays up. Twm, now in possession of the farmer's money and horse, hastily departs for London, later selling the horse.

A tale recounted by Meyrick recalls how Twm was asked by a poor man to steal a pitcher for him. They went together to a merchant where Twm started belittling the man's wares. Having told his friend secretly to take the pitcher of his choice, Twm distracted the merchant by telling him there was a hole in one of the pitchers, which the man denied. Twm desired him to put his hand in the pitcher to test it and the man still denied there was a hole. Twm then asked him how, if there was no hole, could he have put his hand inside? By this time his friend had disappeared with his pitcher, undetected.

A tale from Prichard's book involves an occasion when Twm is staying in an inn overnight and realises other people are planning to rob him the following day after he sets off. He has a large sum of money with him. The following morning he behaves as though his money is in the pack-saddle of his horse. When the highwayman catches up, Twm drops the saddle in the middle of a pool. The highwayman wades into the pool to fetch it. Twm takes the opportunity to make off with the highwayman's horse. A complication arises because the horse responds to the voice of the highwayman crying "Stop!" Luckily Twm, in terror, happens to shout a word which makes the horse gallop on again, and he is conveyed to safety.

Another tale recounts how Twm waylaid a rich squire, who was accompanied by his daughter, Twm was so smitten with her that he returned her jewellery to her and attempted to woo her, against her father's opposition and, initially, her own. One full moon shortly after the robbery, he crept to her window, roused her from sleep, caught her hand at the window and kissed it, refusing to let her go until she promised to marry him. She wouldn't promise so Twm drew his dagger, drew blood on her wrist and threatened to sever her hand unless she assented to marriage forthwith. She agreed to marry him and she kept her hand. Their marriage followed soon after, despite her father's views and the directness of Twm's courtship methods. The girl was supposedly the widow of the sheriff of Carmarthen. Through this marriage Twm is supposed to have gained respectability, eventually becoming a justice of the peace, sitting in judgement on others, a position he held until his death aged 79.

Memorabilia
Twm Siôn Cati's Cave is on Dinas Hill, near Ystrad-ffin and Rhandir-mwyn. There is a steep ascent to the cave, which is surrounded by trees and boulders, and it is necessary to crawl inside. Part of the cave roof has collapsed but the cave itself has obviously been visited over many years, as evidenced by the carvings – one reads 1832. It overlooks the confluence of the River Tywi with the River Pysgotwr.  The Oxford Companion to the Literature of Wales notes that Prichard's vivid descriptions of Twm's cave suggest the author knew the area around Rhandir-mwyn well. Historical accounts have been published by Lynne Hughes (whose book Hawkmoor, was serialised by the BBC in 1977) and three by Welsh-language children's author T. Llew Jones.

The community of Tregaron held a year of activities to commemorate the 400th anniversary of the death of Twm Siôn Cati in 2009.
The year saw activities such as an exhibition at Tregaron Kite Centre (the red kite is common in the area), a charity walk from his cave to his birthplace and the launching of four books. Local artists created souvenir items. A wood-carving of Twm created by Grace Young Monaghan was placed on Tregaron Square.

An international Twm Siôn Cati Day is held each 17 May. A Twm Siôn Cati Community Prize is presented annually to a Tregaron Primary School pupil for doing a good deed in Tregaron. A Twm Town Trail, designed by the school's pupils, is walked by hundreds of people every year.

Television

The television series Hawkmoor created by Lynn Hughes and starring John Ogwen as Twm and Jane Asher as Lady Johane Williams was broadcast by the BBC in 1978, depicting Twm as a Welsh Robin Hood/freedom fighter protecting the Welsh people from the repression of English-born Sheriff John Stedman (Jack May) and the cruel (Catholic) Vicar Davyd (Philip Madoc). A Penguin paperback relating some of the television adventures (and containing a poem actually written by Twm) was written by Lynn Hughes and published in 1978.

References

First edition of The Adventures and Vagaries of Twm Shon Catti online at Books from the Past
Later edition as The Comical Adventures of Twm Shon Catty (Thomas Jones Esq) Commonly Known as the Welsh Robin Hood published in facsimile by Llanerch 1991 
Chapter XCIII of Wild Wales: Its People, Language and Scenery by George Borrow
Meic Stephens 1986 The Oxford Companion to the Literature of Wales, pub: OUP, 
Y Digrifwr: Casgliad o gampiau a dichellion Thomas Jones o Dregaron yn Sir Aberteifi; yr hwn sydd yn cael ei adnobod yn gyffredin wrth yr enw Twm Sion Catti ("The Joker: a collection of exploits and tricks of Thomas Jones of Tregaron in Cardiganshire, commonly known by the name of Twm Sion Catti"): pamphlet published in 1811.

External links 
Places and photos relating to Twm Shon Cati held on Gathering the Jewels
BBC Mid-Wales: Twm Sion Cati

Welsh folklore
Welsh rebels
1609 deaths
Recipients of English royal pardons
Year of birth unknown